Ramon "Mon" Teshiba Tulfo Jr. (born November 22, 1946) is a Filipino TV host, radio broadcaster and columnist for The Philippine Star.

Early life and career
He is the eldest of ten siblings (7 boys, 3 girls). He is the son of the late Colonel Ramon Tulfo Sr. (September 5, 1915 – June 14, 1985) who was a member of Philippine Constabulary and Caridad Teshiba-Tulfo, a housewife. Ramon Tulfo is the host of the 23-year running program, Isumbong Mo kay Tulfo!, a public service program on DZRJ Radyo Bandido. In his hour-long show, he and his co-host Alin Ferrer tackle community problems, including complaints filed against government officials and policemen. He is the brother of Wanda Tulfo Teo, and broadcaster/hosts Ben Tulfo, Senator Raffy Tulfo and DSWD Sec. Erwin Tulfo who all have their own brands of public service programs. Raffy Tulfo was one of the candidates being suggested by PDP–Laban to run for senator, that eventually he won in the May 2022 polls.

Wanda, along with Ben, Raffy and Erwin, became involved in a 60-million peso corruption scandal which happened while Wanda Teo was the tourism chief.

Career
Tulfo occasionally hosts TV5's T3: Kapatid Sagot Kita along with his brothers Ben, Raffy and Erwin.

Special envoy to China
On October 23, 2018, President Rodrigo Duterte appointed Tulfo as the special envoy for public diplomacy to China. He was to hold the post for six months, and had a salary of ₱1 per year. His term was extended for another six months on May 27, 2019. However, as of February 24, 2021, he was unsure if he was still the special envoy to China. According to him, even though his term had already lapsed, his appointment was not revoked either. He also expressed willingness to give up his post to become a Philippine distributor of the Sinopharm BIBP COVID-19 vaccine.

Controversies

Airport brawl with Claudine Barreto and Raymart Santiago
The Movie and Television Review and Classification Board investigated the show, following its May 7, 2012, episode, in which the hosts issued threats to celebrity couple Raymart Santiago and Claudine Barretto in connection with the brawl with their brother Ramon Tulfo at Ninoy Aquino International Airport Terminal 3 on May 6. They made a public apology the following day, but they were still suspended from hosting the show as well as other News5 programs aired in TV5 and AksyonTV for 3 days from May 9–11, 2012.

The MTRCB suspended the show from May 10 to 17. Ramon Tulfo, Martin Andanar and Atty Mel Sta. Maria hosted the May 9 episode before the suspension. TV5 questioned the agency's action, declaring that it could threaten the freedom of the press. A television version of Relasyon from Radyo5 92.3 News FM, hosted by Luchi Cruz-Valdez and Mel Sta. Maria, filled up the T3's timeslot from May 10–11. As of May 14, the timeslot was occupied by Sharon: Kasama Mo, Kapatid and Metro Aksyon which was extended to 30 minutes, carrying T3's format, aside for bringing news. The suspension was later lifted by the MTRCB effective May 17, only 7 days into the scheduled 20-day suspension after the settlement of MTRCB and TV5 and returned on air on the following day.

From May 30 – June 20, 2012, T3 was once again suspended after a "thorough deliberation" by the MTRCB adjudication board. T3's timeslot, once again, was filled up by Metro Aksyon with T3 hosts Ben and Raffy Tulfo anchoring. On June 20, 2012, 3 weeks into the scheduled 3-month suspension, the Court of Appeals issued a 60-day temporary restraining order (TRO) to stop the suspension.

Social and political views
Tulfo has been widely criticized for his public support of the death penalty, whether the case is considered a heinous crime or not. He is also known to possess homophobia, as exemplified by his support for attacks against the LGBT community, to a point where he supported a senator's opinion stating that gays are worse than animals. He has also criticized the Iglesia ni Cristo due to 'personal hatred'. Tulfo has also outspokenly discriminated Muslim Filipinos, using jokes against Islamic beliefs during the height of killings against Muslims in the Philippines. He also drew flak after stating that Muslims in Christian-majority areas should be removed and relocated in war-torn areas in Mindanao.

Philippine General Hospital incident
On August 15, 2018, Mr. Tulfo caused a ruckus at the emergency room department of the Philippine General Hospital. In a video posted on Facebook, Mr. Tulfo can be seen harassing an emergency room physician after the doctor did not want to be recorded on video by Mr. Tulfo prior to providing medical treatment to a child who sustained minor injuries when Mr. Tulfo's convoy hit the child on the same day. Video recording in hospital premises is in violation of the Philippine Data Privacy Act of 2012, as well as in violation of the patient's right to privacy and right to consent. The victim's mother was also seen to be pleading to Mr. Tulfo to stop his harassment as her daughter was getting scared of the ordeal. As of August 20, 2018. Mr. Tulfo has refused to apologize to PGH for the incident

Personal life

Some sources and even his own column in The Manila Times hint that there is occasional friction between the Tulfo siblings, particularly between him, Ben and Raffy, resulting in mutually scathing criticism for the other. However, they have been known to work together as one, with the Mabalacat drug den raid being such an example. Raffy, Erwin and Ben also came to his aid when he was assaulted in the airport, going as far as airing a veiled death threat to the perpetrators.

As of June 2022, his Isumbong Mo Kay Tulfo public service brand has been inherited by his son, Ramon "BON" Tulfo III, and rebranded as Sumbong Mo, Aksyon Ko.

References

1946 births
Filipino radio journalists
Filipino television journalists
Filipino aikidoka
People from Davao City
RPN News and Public Affairs people
Living people
Ramon
News5 people
Philippine Daily Inquirer people
Duterte administration personnel